The 5th Horse is an armoured regiment of the Pakistan Army. It was previously known as the 5th King Edward's Own Probyn's Horse, which was a regular cavalry regiment of the British Indian Army. It was formed in 1921 by the amalgamation of the 11th King Edward's Own Lancers (Probyn's Horse) and the 12th Cavalry.

11th King Edward's Own Lancers (Probyn's Horse)
The regiment known as 11th King Edward's Own Lancers (Probyn's Horse) was originally raised on 1 August 1857 by Captain Frederick Wale as Wale's Horse during the Indian Rebellion of 1857 and served at Lucknow. Captain Wale was killed in action on 1 March 1858, while leading the regiment in the pursuit of rebels, and was replaced by Major Dighton Probyn, VC. In 1860 the regiment was dispatched to China to take part in the Second Opium War. It participated in the advance on Peking and returned to India in 1861 with a good reputation. The regiment saw service in the Second Afghan War of 1878-80 and then took part in the Black Mountains Expedition; it went to Chitral and formed part of the Malakand Field Force. During the First World War, the regiment served in Mesopotamia.
1857   Wale's Horse
1857   1st Sikh Irregular Cavalry
1858   1st Sikh Irregular Cavalry (Probyn's Horse)
1861   11th Regiment of Bengal Cavalry
1864   11th Regiment of Bengal Cavalry (Lancers)
1874   11th Regiment of Bengal Lancers
1876   11th (Prince of Wales's Own) Regiment of Bengal Lancers
1901   11th (Prince of Wales's Own) Bengal Lancers
1903   11th Prince of Wales's Own Lancers
1904   11th Prince of Wales's Own Lancers (Probyn's Horse)
1906   11th King Edward's Own Lancers (Probyn's Horse)

Uniform
The Lancer's uniform of Probyn's Horse was topped by cap-line worn unattached.  Shoulder epaulettes were covered with gilt curb-chains, and plus the Mameluke scimitar.

Mussullmen were unique in wearing a kulla, a pointed cap under the puggaree.  Made of heavy khaki cloth it gave good protection against the sun, and became popular, even with British officers, who's adopted the puggaree as part of their dress.

12th Cavalry
The 12th Cavalry was also raised during the Indian Rebellion of 1857, by Captain PR Hockin in October 1857. It formed part of the 1868 Expedition to Abyssinia (Ethiopia) and served in the Second Afghan War of 1878-80. During the First World War, the regiment fought in the Mesopotamian Campaign.
1857 2nd Sikh Irregular Cavalry
1861 12th Regiment of Bengal Cavalry
1901 12th Bengal Cavalry
1903 12th Cavalry

Probyn's Horse (5th King Edward VII's Own Lancers)
After the First World War, the number of Indian cavalry regiments was reduced from thirty-nine to twenty-one. However, instead of disbanding the surplus units, it was decided to amalgamate them in pairs. This resulted in renumbering and renaming the entire cavalry line. The 11th King Edward's Own Lancers (Probyn's Horse) and the 12th Cavalry were amalgamated at Meerut on 28 August 1921 to form 5th King Edward's Own Probyn's Horse. The uniform of Probyn's Horse was blue with scarlet facings. The new regiment's badge consisted of the Prince of Wales's plumes. Its class composition was one squadron each of Punjabi Muslims, Sikhs and Dogras. The regiment was mechanised in 1940. During the Second World War, the regiment served with great distinction in Burma. On the Partition of India in 1947, Probyn's Horse was allotted to Pakistan. In 1956, Pakistan became a republic and all titles pertaining to British royalty were dropped. The regiment's new designation was 5 Horse, although informally, it continues to be known as the Probyn's Horse. During the Indo-Pakistani War of 1965, 5 Horse fought in the Battle of Khem Karan.
 
1921 11th/12th Probyn's Horse (amalgamation) 
1922 5th King Edward's Own Probyn's Horse
1927 Probyn's Horse (5th King Edward's Own Lancers)  
1937 Probyn's Horse (5th King Edward VII's Own Lancers)
1956 5 Horse

Battle honours

 
Lucknow, Taku Forts, Pekin 1860, Abyssinia, Ali Masjid, Peiwar Kotal, Charasiah, Kabul 1879, Afghanistan 1878–80, Chitral, Malakand, Punjab Frontier, Mesopotamia 1915-18, Meiktila, Capture of Meiktila, Defence of Meiktila, Taungtha, Rangoon Road, Pyawbwe, Pyinmana, Toungoo, Pegu 1945, Burma 1942–45, Khem Karan 1965.

References

Further reading
 Boyle, Maj CA. (1929). The History of Probyn's Horse (5th King Edward's Own Lancers). Aldershot: Gale & Polden.
 Maxwell, Capt EL. (1941). A History of the XI King Edward's Own Lancers (Probyn's Horse). Guilford: AC Curtis Ltd.
 Mylne, Maj MH. (1945). An Account of the Operations in Burma carried out by Probyn’s Horse during February, March & April 1945.
 Kempton, C. (1996). A Register of Titles of the Units of the H.E.I.C. & Indian Armies 1666-1947. Bristol: British Empire & Commonwealth Museum. 
 Gaylor, John. (1991). Sons of John Company: The Indian and Pakistan Armies 1903- 1991. Stroud: Spellmount Publishers Ltd. 
 Cardew, FG. (1903). A Sketch of the Services of the Bengal Native Army to the Year 1895.  Calcutta: Military Department.
 Harris, RG, and Warner, C. (1979). Bengal Cavalry Regiments 1857–1914. London: Osprey Publishing. .
 Elliott, Maj Gen JG. (1968). The Frontier 1839-1947: The Story of the North-West Frontier of India. London: Cassell.
 Kirby, Maj Gen S Woodburn. (1965). The War against Japan, volume 4 (The Reconquest of Burma). London: HMSO.
 Lucas, Sir Charles. (1926). The Empire at War, volume 5. London: Oxford University Press.
 Trench, CC. (1988). The Indian Army and the King’s Enemies, 1900-1947. London: Thames and Hudson.

External links
Probyn's Horse (5th King Edward VII's Own Lancers) by John Gaylor at The Defence Journal
11th Bengal Lancers (Probyn's Horse) at The British Empire

Military units and formations established in 1857
British Indian Army cavalry regiments
Honourable East India Company regiments
Armoured regiments of Pakistan
1857 establishments in India
R